Wonderful is the 10th studio album by American musician Rick James, released in 1988 via Reprise Records. It includes the hit song "Loosey's Rap", which topped the US R&B Charts.

The album peaked at No. 148 on the Billboard 200.

Production
James wrote and produced the album.

Critical reception

The Orlando Sentinel wrote that "despite the dumb lyrics, Wonderful sports some great dance-party music." The Los Angeles Times praised "Loosey's Rap", writing that featured rapper Roxanne Shanté is "tougher than a truckload of leather-wearing Mary Jane Girls, and her B-girl boasting—which she sounds fully capable of backing up—makes her a formidable foil for James and his sly, teasing innuendoes."

Track listing
All tracks composed by Rick James.

 "Wonderful" – 4:19	
 "Judy" – 4:58		
 "Loosey's Rap" (duet with Roxanne Shanté) – 3:54
 "So Tight" – 4:28	
 "Sexual Luv Affair" – 5:13	
 "Love's Fire" – 4:43
 "I Believe in U" – 5:53	
 "In the Girls' Room" – 4:41	
 "Hypnotize" – 4:19
 "Sherry Baby" – 4:43
 "Hot Summer Nights" (duet with Chrissi Scinta) – 5:10

Note
 Track 11 available on CD only.

Personnel
Adapted from the album's liner notes.

Rick James – lead vocals, backing vocals, bass guitar, drums, percussion, keyboards

Stone City Band:
Levi Ruffin, Jr. – strings, synthesizer, backing vocals
Tom McDermott – lead guitar
William Echols – bass guitar
Gregory Treadwell – keyboards, strings
Kenny Hawkins – guitar
Val Young – backing vocals
Jackie Ruffin – backing vocals

Other musicians
Roxanne Shanté – rapping (track 3)
Chrissi Scinta – vocals (track 11)

Production
Produced and arranged by Rick James
Mixing engineers: Rick James, Bruce Kane and Levi Ruffin, Jr.
Assistant engineer: Michael Nally
Recorded and mixed at The Joint Studios, Buffalo, New York
Mastered at Sterling Sound, New York by Jack Skinner
Album coordinators: Levi Ruffin, Jr and Ann Mabin
Art Direction and design: Mary Ann "My Thang" Dibs
Cover concept: Rick James
Photography: Caroline Greyshock, Stuart Watson
Executive producer: Benny Medina
A&R management: Karen Jones

References

1988 albums
Rick James albums
Albums produced by Rick James
Reprise Records albums